The 2019–20 Central Connecticut Blue Devils women's basketball team represented Central Connecticut State University during the 2019–20 NCAA Division I women's basketball season. The Blue Devils were led by thirteenth-year head coach Beryl Piper, and played their home games at the William H. Detrick Gymnasium in New Britain, Connecticut as members of the Northeast Conference. They finished the season 4–25 overall, 3–15 in NEC play to finish in ninth place. They failed to qualify for the NEC Women's Tournament. On March 12, the NCAA announced that all tournaments were cancelled due to the coronavirus pandemic.

Roster

Schedule

|-
!colspan=9 style=| Non-conference regular season

|-
!colspan=9 style=| NEC regular season

References

Central Connecticut Blue Devils women's basketball seasons
Central Connecticut Blue Devils
Central Connecticut Blue Devils women's basketball
Central Connecticut Blue Devils women's basketball